"Sleep and Poetry" (1816) is a poem by the English Romantic poet John Keats. It was started late one evening while staying the night at Leigh Hunt's cottage. It is often cited as a clear example of Keats's bower-centric poetry, yet it contains lines that make such a simplistic reading problematic, such as: 
"First the realm I'll pass/Of Flora, and old Pan ... I must pass them for a nobler life,/Where I may find the agonies, the strife /Of human hearts" (101–102; 123–125).

Furthermore, Keats defends his early "bower-centric" subject matter, which hearkens back to the classical poetic tradition of Homer and Virgil. Keats mounts an attack against Alexander Pope and many of his own fellow Romantic poets by downplaying their poetic departures into the imaginary: "with a puling infant's force/They sway'd about upon a rocking horse,/And thought it Pegasus. Ah dismal soul'd!" (185–7). Although written in simplistic rhyming couplets, the gradual turn towards inwardness serves as an important anticipation for Keats's later poetry.

Excerpt
The poem begins:

References

External links
 

Poetry by John Keats
1816 poems